Renato Giammarioli (Marino, 23 March 1995) is an Italian rugby union player. His usual position is as a Flanker, and he currently plays for Bordeaux, after the brief experience with Worcester Warriors at the begin of 2022-23 season.

For 2014–15 Pro12 season, Giammarioli named like Additional Player for Zebre.
In 2017, after the experience with Top12 team Calvisano, he signed for Zebre and he played for Italian team until 2021–22 United Rugby Championship season.

In 2014 and 2015 Giammarioli was named in the Italy Under 20 squad and in 2016 and 2017 he was part of Emerging Italy squad.

In 2017 Giammarioli was named in the Italy squad for 2017 Autumn International Tests.

References

External links
ESPN Profile
It's Rugby France Profile

1995 births
Living people
Italian rugby union players
Italy international rugby union players
Rugby union flankers
Zebre Parma players
Rugby Calvisano players